John & Tom is a collaboration between actor John C. Reilly and American folk musician Tom Brosseau. It was produced and recorded in Nashville, Tennessee in 2011 by Jack White III and released on Third Man Records.

Track listing 
 "Gonna Lay Down My Old Guitar" (Alton Delmore, Rabon Delmore)
 "Lonesome Yodel Blues #2" (Alton Delmore, Rabon Delmore)

Personnel 
 Tom Brosseau – acoustic guitar, vocals
 John C. Reilly – acoustic guitar, vocals
 Jack White – drums, bass, organ

2011 albums
Albums produced by Jack White